The Reichenau-Tamins–Disentis/Mustér railway (also called the Oberländerlinie—highland line) is a Swiss metre-gauge railway, which is operated by the Rhaetian Railway (Rhätischen Bahn; RhB).

History

Reichenau-Tamins – Ilanz highland line
The first proposals for a highland line or Vorderrhein (Anterior Rhine) line go back to 1890. At that time an engineer, Marchion, applied for a concession for the construction and operation of a railway line from Reichenau to Disentis. Marchion then tested a total of four options for the route from Reichenau to Ilanz. The options started either in  Reichenau or in Bonaduz:
 Bonaduz–Versam–Valendas: 14.7 km-long,  large viaducts, estimated construction cost: CHF 6.2 m
 Reichenau–Trin–Flims–Laax–Ilanz: 25.5 km-long, crest tunnel near Flims, estimated construction cost: CHF 5.5 m
 Reichenau–Trin–Conn–Laax–Ilanz: 23.7 km-long, several viaducts, and two tunnels estimated construction cost: CHF 6.2 m
 a line through the Rhine Gorge: 19.3 km-long, good location, estimated construction cost: CHF 4.3 m.
 
Marchion finally received a concession in 1894 for the Reichenau–Ilanz route, but he sold it to the Rhaetian Railway on 27 November 1897. This company in turn commissioned engineer R. Moser to review all four options. Finally, a commission headed by Professor Albert Heim from Zurich recommended that the latter option be built through the Anterior Rhine Gorge. The Board of the Rhaetian Railway decided to build a line on this route on 11 July 1898. The RhB also considered an option to extend the line from Ilanz further along the Anterior Rhine to Disentis.

Construction 
Construction began in the autumn of 1900 under the direction of senior engineer R. Hennings, who also led the construction work on the Albula Railway at the same time. The 19.3 km-long route was divided into three lots: Reichenau–Versam, Versam–Valendas-Sagogn, and Valendas-Sagogn–Ilanz.
 
The Rhine gorge presented construction workers and engineers with problems, as the rock there is very brittle and the Anterior Rhine in this area rises very high in heavy rain or during snowmelt. In addition, because of its instability, the rock from the Rhine Gorge could not be used for the construction of walls and track, so all the necessary stones had to be brought from more distant quarries. To facilitate this, section engineer Peter Saluz built a 750 mm gauge steam-hauled construction line, which was not opened until 1901.
 
Despite many interruptions due to landslides and floods, the construction work kept to schedule and the Reichenau-Tamins–Ilanz line was formally opened on 1 June 1903.

The Ilanz–Disentis extension
It took a total of nine years until the extension of the highland line from Ilanz to Disentis could be opened. This was due to the fact that two other complementary lines, Davos Platz–Filisur and Samedan–Pontresina, had a higher priority and thus were built first. Engineer R. Moser, who had been commissioned to prepare the plans for this line, relied on the plans of Engineer Marchion, who intended to build the line on the right bank of the Rhine to Trun and then on the northern slope of the Surselva to Disentis. The final project was developed by the Batignolles company in Paris; its projected lines crossed the Rhine three times, but otherwise, it followed the original plan.

The construction works 
Construction began on 10 April 1910 under the direction of Chief Engineer Peter Saluz. The line was divided into four lots: Ilanz–Petersbach, Petersbach–Trun, Trun–Sumvitg-Cumpadials, and Sumvitg-Cumpadials–Disentis. The first two lots did not cause any problems as they ran along the bottom of the valley and required landfills and embankments only when the line approached the river. The other two lots required the construction of engineering structures and tunnels. Disentis station was designed to be larger than all the other stations, as it had already been planned for the opening of the Furka Oberalp Railway. As construction progressed rapidly along the entire line, it was possible to open the line officially on 1 August 1912 after only two years of construction.

New Carrerabach bridge
 
After a construction period of around one year, the new Carrerabach bridge was put into operation on 17 November 2011. Thus, the bridge over the Carrerabach was renewed for the second time since the commissioning of the line. As early as 1981, the original stone arch bridge had been replaced by a new structure. This time, not only was the bridge renewed, but the whole trackbed was rebuilt on a roughly one-kilometre section in order to increase the level in the area of the bridge by around three metres and to move the line laterally in the area of the bridge. The new higher position of the bridge and its displacement was intended to prevent problems with erosion and rockfall and to improve flood protection permanently. Accidents such as the derailment of a regional train on the Carrerabach bridge on 11 September 2011 due to a mudslide following a storm should be avoided in the future.

Route

The line begins at the junction station of the highland line and the Albula Railway at Reichenau-Tamins. It branches off the Landquart–Thusis railway after the steel bridge over the Posterior Rhine. The line then crosses the Anterior Rhine and runs to the entrance of the Rhine gorge at Trin station. In contrast to the parallel road, which rises over 500 metres to Flims and Laax, the railway runs at the bottom of the narrow Ruinaulta gorge. Artificial structures predominate on this part of the line in an otherwise largely untouched landscape. It crosses the gorge with the help of two tunnels and several loops and passes through the stations of Versam-Safien, Valendas-Sagogn and Castrisch. Subsequently, the line runs through the now shallower and wider Anterior Rhine valley to Ilanz where it returns to the side of the road and then climbs at a gradient of 1.6% to Trun. Between Trun and Ilanz, the line crosses the Anterior Rhine three times and passes through two tunnels and the stations of Rueun, Waltensburg/Vuorz and Tavanasa-Breil/Brigels. Between Sumvitg-Cumpadials and Disentis, the valley becomes narrower and steeper, so there are many engineering structures and bridges, such as the 106 m-long Val Russein viaduct between Sumvitg-Cumpadials and Disentis.

Structures

Stations

Versam-Safien 

Versam-Safien station is at the 32.73 km mark of the line. Since the line runs in the very narrow Ruinaulta gorge along the Anterior Rhine, the communities that the stations are named after lie up to three km away and up to 300 m higher. The through station of Versam has two through tracks and two dead-end tracks. The station has a main platform and two island platforms, which are reached by a crossing.
 
The station was built for the opening of the line from Reichenau and Ilanz in 1903. In the past, the importance of the station was higher than it is today. Although a road was completed from Versam to Reichenau and Ilanz in 1881, due to the low motorisation until the 1950s, it must be assumed that the majority of the inhabitants used the railway and thus the station until well into the 20th century. From there they used a stagecoach or in the winter horse sleighs on the unfenced road to Safiental until 1950.
 
The RegioExpress trains of the Rhaetian Railway stop every hour at the station. Freight trains run irregularly and the Glacier Express daily. The Postauto serves the station hourly to spare the passengers the climb to the actual village and to open up the whole Safien valley.
 
The station building is no longer used for rail purposes. Next to the station, there is a wood loading yard, which can be approached via the dead-end tracks.

Valendas-Sagogn 
Also, the Valendas-Sagogn station carries a double name but here for another reason: a bridge over the Rhine, which was built during the construction of the line, allowed access to the station from both sides of the Rhine. The station is located on the southern (right) bank of the Rhine and was opened in 1903 and connected on both sides by a dirt road, which was replaced by a paved road on the Valendas side during improvement works in 2010. Services run every hour towards Ilanz and Disentis as well as towards Reichenau-Tamins, Chur and Scuol-Tarasp. The road to Sagogn remains unpaved.

Bridges
One of the most important bridges is the Russein bridge between Sumvitg and Disentis. The arch bridge, built in 1912 from natural stone, is located parallel to the old Russein bridge (a covered wooden road bridge built in 1857). The bridge is almost 100 m-long and crosses the stream at a height of 56 m on four arches.
 
The bridge over the Val Sogn Placi at Disentis was destroyed by an avalanche on 9 February 1984. The 54 m-long stone arch bridge was replaced by a 54 m-long composite reinforced concrete structure. This bridge was put into operation on 16 November 1985. A temporary emergency bridge had been installed in the meantime.

Operations

The line is mainly served by RegioExpress trains running at hourly intervals with extra services during the peak hours as required. They take an hour and five minutes over the whole line and reach an average speed of 45.5 kilometres per hour. There are also three Glacier Express train pairs each day. Freight trains running irregularly on the line serve the industrial and commercial enterprises in the Anterior Rhine region.

References

Notes

Footnotes

Sources

 
 
 
  (Festschrift for the 100-year anniversary of the line)
 
 
 
 

Railway lines in Switzerland
Railway lines opened in 1903
1903 establishments in Switzerland
Rhaetian Railway lines
Metre gauge railways in Switzerland